Lyubov Vasilyevna Morgunova (born 14 January 1971 in Tatarstan) is a long-distance runner from Russia. She represented her native country at the 2000 Summer Olympics, finishing in 23rd place. Morgunova set her personal best in the same year, clocking 2:26:33.

International competitions

Professional marathons

References

1971 births
Living people
Sportspeople from Tatarstan
Russian female long-distance runners
Russian female marathon runners
Olympic female marathon runners
Olympic athletes of Russia
Athletes (track and field) at the 2000 Summer Olympics
World Athletics Championships athletes for Russia
Russian Athletics Championships winners
20th-century Russian women
21st-century Russian women